Carlos Quijano (Montevideo, 21 March 1900 - Mexico, 10 June 1984) was a Uruguayan lawyer, politician, essayist and journalist.

He is especially remembered as the founder of Marcha.

References

1900 births
1984 deaths
Uruguayan journalists
Uruguayan essayists
Uruguayan politicians
20th-century Uruguayan lawyers
20th-century essayists
20th-century journalists